is an anime series directed by Kunihiko Yuyama and Akira Sugino. It was written by Junki Takegami and produced by Animax network president Masao Takiyama.
Logo Cake Entertainment
It was originally broadcast by Fuji Television in Japan between 19 October 1989 and 26 August 1990.  Time Quest, as it was called outside Japan, was first aired in the Philippines in 1992 on IBC.  It was reaired on ABC (now The 5 Network) in 2000 and GMA Network in 2015. It also was aired in Indosiar, Indonesia during 1995, and it was rerun in Space Toon Indonesia since the year 2008.

Story 
The series starts when Hayato, a soccer enthusiast, and his girlfriend Yumi, an aspiring musician, went to a visit to Dr. Leonard's lab. They accidentally activated the Tondekeman, a funny talking kettle who transported them many centuries in the past.

In Baghdad, Hayato and Yumi gets reunited but they got separated from Tondekeman. They meet Aladdin, Prince Dandarn and Princess Shalala.  They also meet the cunning Abdullah who is always ready to kidnap the princess so that he could marry the princess to his master.

Our heroes get to go to different places and times and meet several historical and literary figures as they follow Abdullah as he escapes through time to abduct the princess.

Hayato and Yumi are stuck in the past until they get Tondekeman from the possession of Abdullah.

Characters 
 Hayato Shindou
 Voiced by Yūji Mitsuya A Soccer enthusiast. He is good at soccer and often kicks the ball to escape the crisis. He wears a headband on his head, a soccer supporter on his wrist, short-sleeved shirt and shorts, and barefoot sneakers. He used to visit Dr. Leonard a lot, because he is strong in machines. His classmate is Yumi from the same school and is quite close. In the 9th century, he was taken care with Yumi of princess Shalala in the palace. In the pre-broadcast material, he was the name "Batto Shindo" taken from Sinbad who appeared in the Thousand and One Nights story. His set age is 14 years of the second year of middle school. However, according to an anime magazine material, he is 11 years old in the 5th grade of elementary school (5-3 is written on the tag at the entrance of the classroom where he came out in the scene where Hayato first appeared in episode 1). His favorite habit is "It's fine".

 Yumi Arama
 Voiced by Kumiko Nishihara Hayato's girlfriend and an aspiring musician. She can tell which time it is in the era by using a portable dictionary in the destination of the dimension hole, which is detailed in the history. There are settings that used to be a band in the 20th century, but it is only used in the opening, episode 1, episode 3 and the final episode. Like Hayato, she is strong in machinery. They often drive a scooter they brought with them since the 20th century. Before the broadcast, she was written as "Miko Himana".

 Tondekeman
 Voiced by Shigeru Chiba A kettle type time machine made of stainless steel. It wears sunglasses and speaks the Kansai dialect. It is programmed to make the person who holds it the "master", and basically only the master's command can be heard. Even if the master changes, it has a good personality that it will immediately sesame. It can make a "dimensional hole" by emitting a ray from its mouth. The hole closes in 10 minutes. Originally, the designation of time and place was done by dialing the part corresponding to the ear, but in reality, most of the time, it was verbally instructed. Moreover, since there are no instructions or it is rough even if there are instructions, Tondekeman often chooses the destination. The built-in computer seems to be excellent, can talk like a human, and has decrypted it. It was once broken in the 15th episode, but has been repaired safely by the repair of Dr. Edison.

 Prince Dandarn
 Voiced by Akira Kamiya The prince of Baghdad and the third son of the Dada family. He is the second one, but he is a big funny man and he looks like he is spoiled. He is desperate for princess Shalala, with the marriage of her. He is courting her, but is treated by the less aggressive princess. He is staying at Shalala's palace.

 Princess Shalala
 Voiced by Rei Sakuma The princess of Baghdad, the only daughter of king Shabada of Baghdad, the best beauty in Arabia and a natural funny woman. She is kidnapped by Abdullah every time. Whether she is got used to it or not having a sense of crisis, she seems to enjoy the situation she is in, and often specifies the destination of the dimension hole.

 Aladdin
 Voiced by Yūko Mita A thief boy who is less than 10 years old, living in Baghdad and appears in episode 2. He is fond of calling Hayato the "big brother", and has since lived in princess Shalala's palace. He is accompanied by the dragon kid, Doramusko, who appeared in episode 8.

 Abdullah
 Voiced by Junpei Takiguchi A sorcerer at the Horrus Empire, self-proclaimed "Mr. Abdullah, the best wizard in Baghdad", short, fat and hairless. Since his power of the bill of the spell attached to his head is used to apply magic, nothing can be done when the bill runs out. The bill is usually hidden in his turban. He has a magic lamp and a flying carpet. He also carries Tondekeman in his belly. Every time, he kidnaps princess Shalala and escapes to another era through the dimensional hole, but he eventually fails and returns. He like lizard tails.

 Dr. Leonardo
 Voiced by Shigeru Chiba Inventor of Tondekeman. At the final episode, Dr. Leonardo reveal that he is Leonardo da Vinci.

 Genie of the Lamp
 Voiced by Shigezou Sasaoka A giant that emerges from Abdullah's magic lamp. He looks like a Superman and always has a high laugh. He can fly in the sky. He is not very smart, but when he get serious, he is so strong. There are many stupid behaviors, such as misunderstanding Poseidon, the sea god, as his father, and falling in love with the Statue of Liberty at first sight. He like lizard tails. He appears as a newspaper reporter in the final episode.

Episodes

Soundtrack 
Opening theme
 Yume mireba Time Machine sung by Jag-Toy

Closing theme
 Tomodachi ni Modorenai sung by Jag-Toy (1-23)
 Soba ni Iru ne sung by Ribbon (24-39)

References

External links 
 
 Sunflower's Time Quest Page
 

1989 anime television series debuts
Action anime and manga
Fantasy anime and manga
Supernatural anime and manga
Ashi Productions
Tatsunoko Production
Japanese time travel television series
Fuji TV original programming